Days of Comedy (Macedonian Cyrillic: Денови на комедија) is an international theater comedy festival in Kumanovo, Macedonia. The festival is held at the Cultural Center Trajko Prokopiev annually. Theaters from Serbia, Bulgaria, Montenegro and other countries participate.

See also
 Cultural Center Trajko Prokopiev
 Museum Kumanovo
 Kumanovo

External links
Article about the festival from 2013 kumanovskimuabeti.mk 19.10.2013
 Article about the festival from 2012 kumanovskimuabeti.mk 01.10.2012
 Article about the festival from 2011 kumanovskimuabeti.mk 30.09.2011

References

Kumanovo
Macedonian culture
Festivals in North Macedonia